Frakes is an unincorporated community located in Bell County, Kentucky, United States.

First settled in the 1850s, it was known as South America for its relative remoteness. The community was renamed in the 1930s for the local pastor Hiram Milo Frakes.

References

Unincorporated communities in Bell County, Kentucky
Unincorporated communities in Kentucky